Deumai is a municipality in the eastern development region of Ilam District in the Mechi Zone of Nepal. The new municipality was formed by merging two existing villages Mangalbare and Dhuseni on 02 Dec 2014. The office of the municipality is that of the former Mangalbare village development committee.

Population
Deumai municipality was formed in 2014 by merging Mangalbare and Dhuseni; it has a total population of 10,946 according to 2011 Nepal census.

Organizations
Kyabung Development Foundation is a non-profit organization established in 2077. It is a non political organization that enhances solidarity among the natives being their birth place in Kyabung for public welfare and prosperity of their origin in addition to living outer area. Kyabung Development Foundation is playing an active role on historical archives, literary researches, art and culture regarding library, educational and sociological functions.	

A historical literary figure of Nepal Mr. Janaklal Sharma Dhakal also was born in Kyabung in 1978 B.S. Kyabung Development Foundation respects him as a living historical literary figure of nepali art and literature organizing various programs every year.
	
Anybody can contribute to enrich the foundation from different places on different means. Headquarter of the Kyabung Development Foundation is in Deumai Municipality Illam, Nepal. The current Chair person of this institution is Mr. Ambika Prasad Khanal.

References

 Kyabung Development Foundation, Kyabung, Illam

External links
District Development Committee, Ilam

See also

Populated places in Ilam District
Municipalities in Koshi Province
Nepal municipalities established in 2014
Municipalities in Ilam District